Arrhythmia is the second studio album from Irish art rock band, Hail the Ghost, which was released on 6 December 2019 on CD, vinyl and digital formats.

Recording
The album was recorded, mixed and mastered in JAM Studios, Kells, Co. Meath in Ireland between 2016 and 2019. The album was produced by Kieran O'Reilly and Martin Quinn.

Album artwork
The album sleeve for Arrhythmia is the work of Italian visual artist, Sveva Robiony.

Album release

Critical reception
The album received favourable reviews with The Irish Times referring to the album as a "smart collection of intelligent and sensitive rock...[that will] do the heart and soul good." Hot Press Magazine reported: "Last time round, we described them as "atmospheric indie", but 'Arrhythmia' is composed of bleaker soundscapes, more reminiscent of Joy Division". Kelly Crisp of The Rosebuds said of the album: "this album [Arrhythmia] is luxurious, and a reminder that we're here now, making art and loving beautiful music".

Personnel 

Hail the Ghost
Kieran O'Reilly – Vocals, Backing Vocals, Drums, Guitar, Percussion
Eamonn Young – Guitars
Ian Corr – Piano/Keyboards

Additional contributors
Martin Quinn - Bass Guitar, Keyboards, Piano, Percussion
Paul Higgins - Guitars, Tracks 4,7,8
Eamonn Young Sr. - Saxophone, Track 10 
Joe Donnelly - Spoken Word, Track 1
Zach Minogue O'Reilly - Boys Laughing, Track 11
Lua Minogue O'Reilly - Boys Laughing, Track 11

Technical Personnel
Producer – Kieran O'Reilly & Martin Quinn
Engineer/Mixer – Martin Quinn
Mastering – Martin Quinn

Live musicians
Kieran O'Reilly – Vocals & Guitar
Eamonn Young – Guitars
Ian Corr – Piano/Keys
Martin Quinn – Bass & Backing Vocals
Paul Higgins – Guitars
Gavin Mulhall – Drums

Track listing

References 

2019 albums
Hail The Ghost albums